Cometti is an Italian surname. Notable people with the name include:

 Dennis Cometti (born 1949), Australian rules football player and coach
 Valerio Cometti (born 1975), Italian industrial designer
 Sara Cristina Cometti, Italian fencer in the 2003 European Fencing Championships

Italian-language surnames